Spinicalliotropis chalkeie is a species of sea snail, a marine gastropod mollusc in the family Eucyclidae.

Description
The length of the shell reaches 6.5 mm.

Distribution
This species occurs in the Pacific Ocean off the Solomon Islands, New Caledonia and Fiji

References

External links
 
 Vilvens C. (2007) New records and new species of Calliotropis from Indo-Pacific. Novapex 8 (Hors Série 5): 1–72
 Kano, Y.; Chikyu, E.; Warén, A. (2009). Morphological, ecological and molecular characterization of the enigmatic planispiral snail genus Adeuomphalus (Vetigastropoda: Seguenzioidea. Journal of Molluscan Studies. 75(4): 397-418

chalkeie
Gastropods described in 2007